The Greenwich University or GU is a private research university located in the residential beach neighborhood DHA Karachi, Karachi, Sindh in Pakistan. It is recognized by the Higher Education Commission (HEC) as an autonomous degree-awarding university and is one of the leading business schools in Pakistan. The alumni of the university are highly placed in their fields, ranging from senators, MNA's, MPA's (Member National Assembly) / (Member Provincial Assembly) to CEO's of leading multinational and national organisations.  The University is empowered to offer its degree program overseas, and to grant affiliation to other institutions.

See also

 Higher Education Commission of Pakistan
 Pakistan Educational Research Network
 List of tertiary institutions in Mauritius

References

External links

Universities and colleges in Karachi
Private universities and colleges in Sindh
Universities in Mauritius